Islington Central was a parliamentary constituency in the Islington district of Inner London.  It returned one Member of Parliament (MP) to the House of Commons of the Parliament of the United Kingdom.

The constituency was created for the February 1974 general election, and abolished for the 1983 general election.

Boundaries 
The London Borough of Islington wards of Canonbury, Highbury, Holloway, Mildmay, and Quadrant.

Members of Parliament

Election results

Elections in the 1970s

See also 
 List of parliamentary constituencies in Islington

References 

Parliamentary constituencies in London (historic)
Constituencies of the Parliament of the United Kingdom established in 1974
Constituencies of the Parliament of the United Kingdom disestablished in 1983
Politics of the London Borough of Islington